Tentaculites is an extinct genus of conical fossils of uncertain affinity, class Tentaculita, although it is not the only member of the class. It is known from  Lower Ordovician to Upper Devonian deposits both as calcitic shells with a brachiopod-like microstructure and carbonaceous 'linings'.  The "tentaculites" (i.e. tentaculita) are also referred to as the styliolinids.

Affinity
The taxonomic classification of tentaculitids is uncertain.  Some grouped them with pteropods, but there is no modern support and only superficial similarity. They may also be related to other conical shells of uncertain affinity including cornulitids, Anticalyptraea, microconchids and trypanoporids.
Their shell microstructure has warranted their comparison with the brachiopods and phoronids,
and the possible Ediacaran lophophorate Namacalathus.

Morphology 

Tentaculitids have ribbed, cone-shaped shells which range in length from 5 to 20 mm.  Some species septate; their embryonic shell, which is retained, forms a small, sometimes spherical, chamber.

Ecology
Some species are inferred to have been planktonic.

See also 
Mari Mari Group, fossil formation in the state of Amazonas of northwestern Brazil

References

Further reading
 Treatise on Invertebrate Paleontology, Part W - Miscellanea. Geological Society of America and University of Kansas Press, 1962. LCCN 53012913

Devonian animals
Late Devonian animals
Tentaculita
Early Ordovician first appearances
Late Devonian genus extinctions
Silurian animals of North America
Paleozoic life of Ontario
Paleozoic life of Alberta
Paleozoic life of the Northwest Territories
Paleozoic life of Nova Scotia
Paleozoic life of Quebec
Paleozoic life of Yukon